The Liberian First Division, formerly known as Liberian Premier League, is the highest division of football in Liberia. The first division league began in 1956 and have only once been won by a club outside Monrovia. It has been dominated by  Mighty Barrolle FC and Invincible Eleven FC. The league is organized by the Liberia Football Association. In 2010, the league became known as the Orange Premier League for sponsorship reasons and it is now called LFA-Orange First Division League.

Sponsorship 
In March 2010, Cellcom GSM, a telecommunications corporation in Liberia and Guinea contracted a three-year sponsorship deal with the League until the end of the 2012/13 season.

In October 2013, Cellcom GSM and the Liberia Football Association extended their deal to another three years until the end of the 2015/16 season.

Clubs

Note: Table lists in alphabetical order.

Previous champions

1956-62 : unknown
1963 : Invincible Eleven (Monrovia)
1964 : Invincible Eleven (Monrovia)
1965 : Invincible Eleven (Monrovia)
1966 : Invincible Eleven (Monrovia)
1967 : Mighty Barrolle (Monrovia)
1968-71 : no championship
1972 : Mighty Barrolle (Monrovia)
1973 : Mighty Barrolle (Monrovia)
1974 : Mighty Barrolle (Monrovia)
1975 : no championship
1976 : Saint Joseph Warriors (Monrovia)
1977 : no championship
1978 : Saint Joseph Warriors (Monrovia)
1979 : Saint Joseph Warriors (Monrovia)
1980 : Invincible Eleven (Monrovia)
1981 : Invincible Eleven (Monrovia)
1982 : no championship
1983 : Invincible Eleven (Monrovia)
1984 : Invincible Eleven (Monrovia)
1985 : Invincible Eleven (Monrovia)
1986 : Mighty Barrolle (Monrovia)
1987 : Invincible Eleven (Monrovia)
1988 : Mighty Barrolle (Monrovia)
1989 : Mighty Barrolle (Monrovia)
1990 : no championship
1991 : LPRC Oilers (Monrovia)
1992 : LPRC Oilers (Monrovia)
1993 : Mighty Barrolle (Monrovia)
1994 : NPA Anchors (Monrovia)
1995 : Mighty Barrolle (Monrovia)
1996 : Junior Professional (Monrovia)
1997 : Invincible Eleven (Monrovia)
1998 : Invincible Eleven (Monrovia)
1999 : LPRC Oilers (Monrovia)
2000/01 : Mighty Barrolle (Monrovia)
2002 : LPRC Oilers (Monrovia)
2003 : not finished
2004 : Mighty Barrolle (Monrovia)
2005 : LPRC Oilers (Monrovia)
2006 : Mighty Barrolle (Monrovia)
2007 : Invincible Eleven (Monrovia)
2008 : Black Star (Monrovia)
2009 : Mighty Barrolle (Monrovia)
2010/11 : LISCR (Monrovia)
2012 : LISCR (Monrovia)
2013 : Barrack Young Controllers (Monrovia)
2013/14 : Barrack Young Controllers (Monrovia)
2015 : Nimba United
2016 : Barrack Young Controllers (Monrovia)
2016/17 : LISCR (Monrovia)
2018 : Barrack Young Controllers (Monrovia)
2019 : LPRC Oilers (Monrovia)
2019/20 : Abandoned
2020/21 : LPRC Oilers (Monrovia) 
2021/22 : Watanga FC (Monrovia)

Performance By Club

Top scorers

See also
Liberia national football team

References

External links
Liberia Football Association
Liberia – List of Champions at RSSSF

Football leagues in Liberia
Liberia
Sports leagues established in 1956
1956 establishments in Liberia